Several ships of the Royal Navy have been named HMS Cleopatra, after the Egyptian Queen Cleopatra:

  was a 32-gun fifth rate, built in 1779 and broken up in 1814. The French captured her in 1805 and she spent several days in their hands before being recaptured.
  was a 26-gun sixth rate built in 1835 and broken up in 1862.
  was a Comus-class screw corvette built in 1878, and used for harbour service from 1905. She was renamed Defiance III in 1922 and sold for breaking up in 1931.
  was a  light cruiser built in 1915 and broken up in 1931.
  was a  built in 1940 and broken up in 1958.
  was a  launched in 1964 and sold for scrap in 1993.

Royal Navy ship names